Green Hills is an unincorporated community located in Robeson Township in Berks County, Pennsylvania, United States. Green Hills is located along Pennsylvania Route 10 north of Pennsylvania Route 568 at exit 7 of Interstate 176.

References

External links

Unincorporated communities in Berks County, Pennsylvania
Unincorporated communities in Pennsylvania